Events from the year 1995 in Belgium

Incumbents
Monarch: Albert II
Prime Minister: Jean-Luc Dehaene

Events
 21 May – 1995 Belgian federal election
 June – Pope John Paul II visits Belgium.

Publications
 Filip Reyntjens, Rwanda: trois jours qui ont fait basculer l'histoire (Brussels, Institut Africain)
 Raoul Van Caenegem, An Historical Introduction to Western Constitutional Law (Cambridge University Press)

Births
 February 5 – Adnan Januzaj, footballer
 March 8 – Luca Brecel, snooker player
 April 18 – Divock Origi, footballer
 November 17 – Elise Mertens, tennis player

Deaths
 10 August — Leo Apostel (born 1925), philosopher

References

 
Belgium
Years of the 20th century in Belgium
1990s in Belgium
Belgium